Carry or carrying may refer to:

People
Carry (name)

Finance
 Carried interest (or carry), the share of profits in an investment fund paid to the fund manager
 Carry (investment), a financial term: the carry of an asset is the gain or cost of holding the asset

Firearms
 Concealed carry, carrying a firearm or other weapon in public in a concealed manner
 Open carry, openly carrying a firearm in public

Sports & gaming
 Carry, a fault in the game of pickleball
 Carry (American football), a statistical term equivalent to a single rushing play
 Carry (eSports), a type of role in multiplayer online battle arena games
 Carrying (basketball), a rule breach in basketball

Other
 Carry (arithmetic), when a digit is larger than a limit and the extra is moved to the left
 Carry flag, the equivalent in calculation in a computer
 "Carry" (song), a song by Tori Amos
 Suzuki Carry, a light commercial vehicle

See also
 
 Carey (disambiguation)
 Carrie (disambiguation)
 Cary (disambiguation)
Carny (disambiguation)
Carra (disambiguation)